Mary Louise Butcher "Polly" Hill (January 30, 1907 – April 25, 2007) was an American horticulturist best known for testing how well plants could survive in cold climates. She founded the Polly Hill Arboretum on Martha's Vineyard, Massachusetts.

Born in Ardmore, Pennsylvania, she graduated in 1928 from Vassar College. She went to Japan to teach English and learned about flower arrangement there. After returning to the United States, she studied botany and horticulture at the University of Maryland. She began her work in 1958 after inheriting what is now the arboretum from her parents.

Death
Hill died in Hockessin, Delaware at age 100.

References

External links
Polly Hill Arboretum

1907 births
2007 deaths
Vassar College alumni
University of Maryland, College Park alumni
American centenarians
Women centenarians